Seán Tobin (born 18 December 1989) is an Irish hurling coach and former player. In a career that spanned three decades he lined out at club level with Murroe-Boher and at inter-county level with the Limerick senior hurling team.

Career

Murroe-Boher

After coming to hurling prominence as a student at CBS Sexton Street, Tobin later lined out in the Fitzgibbon Cup with the Limerick Institute of Technology while simultaneously joining Murroe-Boher's top adult club team. In 2017, he won a Premier Intermediate Championship title after top-scoring with 1-10 in a 1-21 to 1-15 replay defeat of Garryspillane. On 9 June 2021, Tobin announced his retirement from the club game at the age of 31 because of injury.

Limerick

Tobin first played for Limerick as a member of the minor team on 24 June 2007. He was held scoreless in a 0–12 to 3–21 Munster semi-final defeat by Tipperary. Over the following three years he was a regular with the Limerick under-21 team, however, his side enjoyed little success during that period.

Tobin made his senior debut for Limerick in a 2–09 to 0–06 league defeat of Clare on 13 February 2011. He became a regular throughout the group stage games and ended the campaign with a Division 2 winners' medal following a 4–12 to 2–13 defeat of Clare in the final. Tobin contributed 1-01 during that game.

On 12 June 2011 Tobin made his senior championship debut in a 3–15 to 3–14 Munster semi-final defeat by Waterford.

In 2013 Tobin won a Munster Championship medal following a 0–24 to 0–15 victory over Cork.

In March 2016 Tobin left the Limerick senior team citing a lack of game time under manager T. J. Ryan as his primary reason.

Career statistics

Honours

Murroe-Boher
Limerick Premier Intermediate Hurling Championship: 2017

Limerick
Munster Senior Hurling Championship: 2013
National Hurling League Division 2: 2011

References

1989 births
Living people
Murroe-Boher hurlers
Limerick inter-county hurlers
Sportspeople from Limerick (city)
Hurling coaches
Irish schoolteachers